Antioch on the Maeander or Antiochia on the Maeander, earlier Pythopolis, was a city of ancient Caria, in Anatolia.  The city was situated between the Maeander and Orsinus rivers near their confluence. Though it was the site of a bridge over the Maeander, it had "little or no individual history". The scanty ruins are located on a hill (named, in Turkish, Yenişer) a few km southeast of Kuyucak, Aydın Province, Turkey, near the modern city of Başaran, or the village of Aliağaçiftliği. The city already existed when Antiochus I enlarged and renamed it.  It was home to the sophist Diotrephes.

The Venus de Milo is believed to have been sculpted by a citizen of Antioch on the Maeander, …andros (possibly Alexandros).

In 1148 the army of the Second Crusade forced a passage of the Maeander at Antioch in the face of determined Turkish resistance in the Battle of the Meander.
In 1211 the city was the site of the Battle of Antioch on the Meander between the Byzantine rump Empire of Nicaea and the Seljuk Sultanate of Rûm.

The town has not been excavated, although Christopher Ratté and others visited the site in 1994 and produced a sketch plan. The remains of a Roman stadium  in length are also visible.

Bishopric 
The bishopric of Antioch on the Maeander was a suffragan of the metropolitan see of Stauropolis, capital of the Roman province of Caria. Its bishop Eusebius was at the First Council of Nicaea in 325, Dionysius at the Council of Chalcedon in 451, Georgius at the Trullan Council in 692, and Theophanes at the Photian Council of Constantinople (879). Menophanes was deposed in 518 for Monophysitism.

No longer a residential bishopric, Antioch on the Maeander (Antiochia ad Maeandrum in Latin) is today listed by the Catholic Church as a titular see.

Known Bishops
Vicente de Paulo Araújo Matos (21 Apr 1955 Appointed - 28 Jan 1961) 
Félix Guiller (10 Apr 1961 Appointed - 10 Jun 1963) 
Edward Louis Fedders, (29 Oct 1963 Appointed - 11 Mar 1973)

See also
List of ancient Greek cities

References

Bibliography 
Blue Guide, Turkey: The Aegean and Mediterranean Coasts, p. 359.

Archaeological sites in the Aegean Region
Hellenistic Caria
Seleucid colonies in Anatolia
Ruins in Turkey
Former populated places in Turkey
History of Aydın Province
Populated places in ancient Caria
Kuyucak District